Asura umbrosa is a moth of the family Erebidae first described by George Hampson in 1896. It is found in Assam, India.

References

umbrosa
Moths described in 1896
Moths of Asia